The discography of American girl group the Pussycat Dolls consists of two studio albums, two extended plays, two video albums, 15 singles, two promotional singles, and 15 music videos. To date, the group has sold 15 million albums and 40 million singles worldwide.

In 2003, Robin Antin struck a joint venture with Interscope Records to develop the Pussycat Dolls into a recording group. In 2004, the group made their musical debut by releasing a cover of "Sway" for the soundtrack of the film Shall We Dance?.

Their self-titled debut album was released in September 2005 and it peaked at number five on the Billboard 200. It earned double platinum certification in the United States by the Recording Industry Association of America (RIAA), 3× Platinum in Australia by the Australian Recording Industry Association (ARIA), and 4× Platinum in the United Kingdom by the British Phonographic Industry (BPI). The album's lead single, "Don't Cha", peaked atop the charts in 15 countries and reached number two on the Billboard Hot 100 and was certified platinum by the RIAA. Its follow-up singles, "Stickwitu" and "Buttons", were also a commercial success peaking in the top five on charts worldwide. After the success of their debut album, the Pussycat Dolls released their first video album, PCD Live from London, in 2006 to coincide with the group's headlining world tour. As of 2008, PCD has sold nearly three million copies in the United States.

After a three-year hiatus in hopes to further Scherzinger's own solo career, the group reunited to release their second and final studio album, Doll Domination, in September 2008. Scherzinger began to receive a larger input in the recording process as co-writer and co-producer of the album. Doll Domination garnered a higher peak position than PCD of number four on Billboard 200, but failed to match its predecessor's commercial success. Its lead single, "When I Grow Up", became another top ten single for the group. "I Hate This Part" was released as the second single and managed to attain similar success. In early 2009, Doll Domination was re-released as two compilation albums. The lead single from Doll Domination 2.0 was "Jai Ho! (You Are My Destiny)", which reached number one in seven countries. The follow-up single, "Hush Hush; Hush Hush", reached the top 20 worldwide. In 2010, the original recording group line-up disbanded.

Studio albums

Reissues

Video albums

Extended plays

Singles

Promotional singles

Other charted songs

Guest appearances

Music videos

Notes

References

External links

 Official website
 
 The Pussycat Dolls at Musicbrainz

Discography
Rhythm and blues discographies
Discographies of American artists
Pop music group discographies